The Coroner's Court of New South Wales is the court in the Australian state of New South Wales where legal proceedings, in the form of an inquest or inquiry, are held and presided over by the State Coroner of New South Wales (or NSW State Coroner), a Deputy State Coroner of New South Wales, or another coroner of the state of New South Wales.

Coroners must be magistrates in the state and sit in branches of the Local Court of New South Wales. They hold jurisdiction over the remains of a person and have the power to make findings in respect of the cause of death of a person or the cause of any fire in New South Wales.

Generally, there are no appeals from the decision(s) of a coroner; there is, however, provision for the Supreme Court of New South Wales to order a fresh inquest or inquiry or to grant prerogative relief in respect of the proceedings.

History
The office of coroner in New South Wales derives from the legal framework inherited from the historical origins of the state and, ultimately, the United Kingdom. Admiral Arthur Phillip, the first governor of the Colony of New South Wales, was authorised by the British monarch to appoint such officials as were necessary for the administration of justice in the colony. This authority came to Phillip through what is commonly called the "second commission". One of the offices that he could appoint was that of coroner.

In the early days of the colony, the role of the coroner was often performed by a justice of the peace. The first inquiry in the nature of a coronial inquest was conducted on 14 December 1788 and was presided over by Augustus Alt, one of the first justices of the peace appointed by Phillip.

The office of the State Coroner of New South Wales was established in 1988, prior to which the coronial system comprised a City Coroner, a Westmead Coroner (which was preceded by Parramatta, Penrith, and Campbelltown Coroners), and coroners in most New South Wales country towns. After the discovery of asbestos in the file storage area of the Westmead Coroner's Court in 2007, the Westmead Coroner's Court was indefinitely closed. An investigation was conducted following its closure. In 2008, the adjacent Westmead Morgue was closed, largely due to budgetary and sustainability concerns.

The City (or State) Coroner's Court, Lidcombe is located at the Forensic Medicine and Coroners Court complex at 1A Main Avenue, Lidcombe 2141.

Structure and jurisdiction
The Coroner's Court is in the state stream of the Australian court hierarchy, and its operation is defined by state legislation. The Governor may also appoint Coroners and Assistant Coroners, generally, from amongst registrars employed in the New South Wales court system so that coronial services are available in regional areas of New South Wales.

The State Coroner has the function:
to oversee and coordinate coronial services in the state and to ensure that all deaths, suspected deaths, fires, and explosions over which a coroner has jurisdiction to hold an inquest or inquiry are properly investigated;
to ensure that an inquest or inquiry is held whenever it is required; and,
to issue guidelines to coroners to assist them in the exercise or performance of their functions.

Where a serious criminal offence has been disclosed during the course of an inquest or an inquiry, a coroner may terminate the proceedings and must refer that matter to a Director of Public Prosecutions (State or Commonwealth) for consideration of the initiation, or institution, of criminal proceedings.

All magistrates in New South Wales are ex officio coroners by virtue of their appointment as magistrates.

List of State Coroners
Prior to the creation of the office of the State Coroner in 1988, coronial inquests were conducted by the Sydney City Coroner for greater metropolitan Sydney, and across New South Wales by magistrates in the Local Court as ex-officio coroners. The Coroner's Court building and morgue moved to the current location at Glebe in the early 1970s.

Notable inquests
1963 Bogle–Chandler case
1977 murder of Donald Mackay
1985 suspected murder of Christopher Dale Flannery
1986 murder of Sallie-Anne Huckstepp
Bowraville murders
1994 Disappearance of Revelle Balmain
Sydney siege inquest following the 2014 Sydney hostage crisis

See also

List of New South Wales courts and tribunals
Old Coroner's Court, The Rocks

References

External links

Coroners Act 2009 (NSW)

New South Wales courts and tribunals
New South Wales
Glebe, New South Wales